State Highway 80 (SH 80) is a state highway in the U.S. state of Texas that runs  from Karnes City to San Marcos.

History
The original highway was designated on August 21, 1923 from San Marcos to Luling, replacing most of  SH 29A (the rest of SH 29A was cancelled). On October 12, 1925, SH 80 was extended to Wimberley, but this did not take effect until January 1, 1926. On April 6, 1932, SH 80 had a planned extension south to Nixon designated. On February 13, 1934, SH 80 was extended west to south of Blanco. On July 17, 1934, it was rerouted to end in Refugio over part of SH 29. This change was undone on January 19, 1935. On July 15, 1935, the section west of Wimberley was cancelled. On September 22, 1936, SH 80 was extended to Karnes City, replacing a portion of SH 112. On September 26, 1939, SH 80 was extended southwest to the Atascosa/Karnes County Line, replacing SH 312. On February 20, 1940, the section from Karnes City to the Atascosa/Karnes County Line was cancelled. On March 26, 1942, the section from Wimberley to San Marcos was transferred to Ranch to Market Road 12. On December 4, 1952, SH 80 was extended over old US 181 to new US 181. On June 21, 1990, this extension was cancelled, as it became part of Business US 181. On June 24, 2010, RM 12 was shifted to an alignment south of San Marcos, and the SH 80 designation was extended through the city to a terminus with RM 12 west of the city. On January 26, 2017, the section of SH 80 from RM 12 to Loop 82 was removed from the state highway system and was given to the city of San Marcos.

Major intersections

References

080
Transportation in Hays County, Texas
Transportation in Caldwell County, Texas
Transportation in Guadalupe County, Texas
Transportation in Gonzales County, Texas
Transportation in Wilson County, Texas
Transportation in Karnes County, Texas